Sangliana is a politician from Mizoram who was the first Member of the Parliament of India representing Mizoram in the 5th Lok Sabha, the lower house of the Indian Parliament. He was elected as a candidate of the Mizo Union. He is from Christian community.

References 

India MPs 1971–1977
Year of birth missing (living people)
Living people
Lok Sabha members from Mizoram
Mizo people